Au Yeung Yiu Chung (born 11 July 1989 in Hong Kong), commonly known as Au Chung, is a Hong Kong professional footballer who currently plays for J3 League club Iwate Grulla Morioka.

Club career
Au Yeung studied at Yan Chai Hospital Tung Chi Ying Memorial Secondary School in Shatin and played for the school's football team in inter-school tournaments.

Early career
Au Yeung made his debut in the Hong Kong First Division League for Hong Kong 08. After the team was disbanded at the end of the season, he turned down an offer from South China to join Workable for the 2007–08 season.

After one season with Workable, which sees the team relegated for 2008–09 season, Au Yeung finally joins South China and takes over the vacant no. 10 shirt. He was only 18 when he signed for South China.

South China
At South China his playing opportunities are less regular, as he plays in a similar position as team captain Li Haiqiang.

In 2010, Au spent a week with Tottenham Hotspur, the club partner of South China AA, and trained with the first team and received personal training from the Hotspurs.

In October 2011, Au Yeung and teammate Kwok Kin Pong were sent to Tottenham Hotspur for training with Spurs' first team as part of the duo's development.

In the 2011 AFC Cup, Au Yeung was sent on as a substitute against East Bengal. He played on the right wing and delivered a perfect cross for Mateja Kežman to head home and scored the winning goal for South China.

Yokohama FC Hong Kong
On 10 June 2013, Yokohama FC Hong Kong announced that they have recruited Au Yeung and will send him, alongside Wong Wai, Leung Kwun Chung and Lee Kar Yiu to Yokohama FC on 16 June for a month's training. Au Yeung said he joined Yokohama FC Hong Kong because he wants more playing opportunities. He will wear number 19 for his new club.

He scored his only goal in the season against Sunray Cave JC Sun Hei on 30 March 2014.

Atlético CP
On 22 August 2014, Atlético CP announced through their official website that they have completed the transfer of Au Yeung. He made his debut against S.C. Olhanense on 24 May 2015.

GS Loures
Au Yeung was unable to establish a place in Atlético CP. He transferred to G.S. Loures on 1 November 2015. Also, he has played 90 minutes for the first match.

Guizhou Zhicheng
On 26 December 2015, Au Yeung had signed by China League One club Guizhou Zhicheng with a 3 years contract.

Dreams FC
On 2 March 2018, Hong Kong Premier League club Dreams announced that they had signed Au Yeung. On 3 July 2018, the club announced that Au Yeung's services would not be retained.

Tai Po
After an injury-shorted half season, Au Yeung left Dreams. He signed a one-year contract with Tai Po on 31 July 2018 in order to work with head coach Lee Chi Kin.

Even though he had experience in Chinese Super League and Chinese League One in the previous year, Au Yeung was unable to break into the first team, and his chances were limited in the reserve team. He was played 4 times in the entire season, including 2 league matches, 1 cup match and 1 AFC match.

On 19 June 2019, Au Yeung announced that his contract with Tai Po had ended and would search for a new club abroad.

Hong Kong Rangers
On 31 July 2019, Au Yeung signed a one-year contract with Hong Kong Rangers. He became a regular player in the first two league matches but failed to lead the team to victory.
And he went on playing for the club in the first half of the 2019–20 season while a regular starting XI place was not guaranteed due to the arrival of several attacking players. He was released by the club after the club announced that they would withdraw from the remaining of the season.

YSCC Yokohama
On 13 April 2021, J3 League club YSCC Yokohama announced that they have signed a contract with Au Yeung.  He became the first Hong Kong player to play for a J.League club.

On 7 January 2023, Au Yeung confirmed that he has already left the club.

Iwate Grulla Morioka
On 21 January 2023, J3 League club Iwate Grulla Morioka announced that they have signed a contract with Au Yeung.

International career
He was selected for the Hong Kong team in 2008 and made his international debut in the 9–1 thrashing of Macau in November of the same year, scoring one goal.

On 14 January 2009, he scored his second goal for Hong Kong with a freekick against India. On 30 September 2011, Au Yeung scored the equalising goal in the 3:3 draw with the Philippines in the 2011 Long Teng Cup.

2009 East Asian Games

Au Yeung was appointed as captain by coach Kim Pan-gon for the 2009 East Asian Games. He led the side to the final against Japan, which ended 1–1 after extra time. Despite Au Yeung missing the first kick, Hong Kong scored the following four while Japan missed two, winning the gold medal.

2010 Asian Games
Au Yeung was a member of the Hong Kong national under-23 football team again for the 2010 Asian Games. In the final group game, Au Yeung scored two goals against Bangladesh and helped Hong Kong win 4:1 and advance to the knock-out stage for the first time in 52 years. But Hong Kong was then eliminated by 0:3 by Oman.

2012 Olympic Games
Au Yeung was a member of the Hong Kong national under-23 football team again for the 2012 London Olympics. The team won its first round tie against Maldives by 7:0 aggregate score but lost 0:3 on aggregate to Uzbekistan in the second round.

He has been omitted from the national squad ever since due to his lack of form.

Honours

Club
South China
Hong Kong First Division: 2008–09, 2009–10
Hong Kong Senior Shield: 2009–10
Hong Kong FA Cup: 2010–11
Hong Kong League Cup: 2010–11

Tai Po
 Hong Kong Premier League: 2018–19

International
 East Asian Games: 2009

Career statistics

Club
As of 7 Oct 2015

International

Hong Kong U-23
As of 29 February 2012

Hong Kong
As of 16 October 2012

Notes

References

External links
Au Yeung Yiu Chung at HKFA

Au Yeung Yiu Chung's Facebook Page

1989 births
Living people
Hong Kong footballers
Association football midfielders
Shek Kip Mei SA players
South China AA players
Yokohama FC Hong Kong players
Atlético Clube de Portugal players
GS Loures players
Guizhou F.C. players
Dreams Sports Club players
Tai Po FC players
Hong Kong Rangers FC players
YSCC Yokohama players
Iwate Grulla Morioka players
Hong Kong First Division League players
China League One players
Chinese Super League players
Hong Kong Premier League players
J3 League players
Hong Kong expatriate sportspeople in China
Hong Kong international footballers
Footballers at the 2010 Asian Games
Hong Kong expatriate footballers
Expatriate footballers in Portugal
Expatriate footballers in China
Expatriate footballers in Japan
Asian Games competitors for Hong Kong
Hong Kong expatriate sportspeople in Japan
Hong Kong expatriate sportspeople in Portugal